Below is an episodic synopsis of Don't Stop Believin', which consists of 20 episodes and a sneak preview, and will be broadcast on MediaCorp Channel 8.

Episodic synopsis

See also
List of MediaCorp Channel 8 Chinese Drama Series (2010s)
Don't Stop Believin'

Lists of Singaporean television series episodes